Shakhtar Sverdlovsk was a professional Ukrainian football club based in Luhansk oblast's Sverdlovsk city (Dovzhansk).
The club competed in the Ukrainian Second League but was suspended after the 2013–14 amid the Russian aggression against Ukraine.

The club holds a record in number of seasons (23) in which the club was fielding its team/teams in national (republican) amateur competitions (Ukrainian Amateur Football Championship).

History
Shakhtar Sverdlovsk was founded in 1939. The club represents State Mining Company "Sverdlovantratsyt" (Sverdlov Anthracite).

After Ukrainian independence, the club competed in the Luhansk Oblast football competition. They performed well and decided to enter the professional ranks in 1995. This proved disastrous as the harsh economic conditions of the time took a toll and the club's administration decided that in the best interests of the club that they return to competing in the oblast league.

Between 1996 and 2006, while competing in the Luhansk Oblast league they won their 6th oblast championship. This improvement and an era of stability within the club gave them renewed interest in improving their classification level. After winning the Ukrainian Amateur Cup (Fourth level of Football in Ukraine) in 2006, the club decided to return to the professional ranks. Shakhtar Sverdlovsk was admitted to the Ukrainian Second League for the 2007–08 season.

Honors

Ukrainian Druha Liha:
Runners up (1): 2012–13 

Ukrainian Amateur Football Championship
 Winners (1): 2006

 Luhansk Oblast football championship
 Winners (9): 1995, 1956, 1961, 1971, 1982, 1998, 2002, 2005, 2006

 Football championship of Russian-occupied Luhansk Oblast (LNR)
 Winners (1): 2018
 Runners up (1): 2017

League and cup history

{|class="wikitable"
|-bgcolor="#efefef"
! Season
! Div.
! Pos.
! Pl.
! W
! D
! L
! GS
! GA
! P
!Domestic Cup
!colspan=2|Europe
!Notes
|-
|align=center|1979
|align=center|4th
|align=center|6
|align=center|20
|align=center|7
|align=center|6  
|align=center|7
|align=center|16
|align=center|18
|align=center|20
|align=center|
|align=center|
|align=center|
|align=center|
|-
|align=center|1980
|align=center|4th
|align=center|8
|align=center|22
|align=center|7
|align=center|7  
|align=center|8
|align=center|29
|align=center|21
|align=center|21
|align=center|
|align=center|
|align=center|
|align=center|
|-
|align=center|1981
|align=center|4th
|align=center|4
|align=center|22 
|align=center|11
|align=center|3  
|align=center|8
|align=center|34
|align=center|28
|align=center|25
|align=center|
|align=center|
|align=center|
|align=center|
|-
|align=center|1982
|align=center|4th
|align=center bgcolor=silver|2
|align=center|14 
|align=center|8
|align=center|4   
|align=center|2     
|align=center|29 
|align=center|9      
|align=center|20
|align=center|
|align=center|
|align=center|
|align=center|
|-
|align=center|1983
|align=center|4th
|align=center|5
|align=center|14 
|align=center|4
|align=center|3   
|align=center|7     
|align=center|15 
|align=center|22      
|align=center|11
|align=center|
|align=center|
|align=center|
|align=center|
|-
|align=center|1984
|align=center|4th
|align=center|6
|align=center|14 
|align=center|4   
|align=center|4   
|align=center|6     
|align=center|14 
|align=center|19      
|align=center|12
|align=center|
|align=center|
|align=center|
|align=center|
|-
|align=center|1985
|align=center|4th
|align=center|6
|align=center|14 
|align=center|4 
|align=center|3   
|align=center|7     
|align=center|16 
|align=center|24      
|align=center|11
|align=center|
|align=center|
|align=center|
|align=center|
|-
|align=center|1986
|align=center|4th
|align=center bgcolor=tan|3
|align=center|14 
|align=center|8 
|align=center|1  
|align=center|5     
|align=center|20 
|align=center|14     
|align=center|17
|align=center|
|align=center|
|align=center|
|align=center|
|-
|align=center|1987
|align=center|4th
|align=center|7
|align=center|18 
|align=center|6
|align=center|4  
|align=center|8     
|align=center|19 
|align=center|22    
|align=center|16
|align=center|
|align=center|
|align=center|
|align=center|
|-
|align=center|1988
|align=center|4th
|align=center|9
|align=center|22 
|align=center|7 
|align=center|4  
|align=center|11    
|align=center|31 
|align=center|28   
|align=center|18
|align=center|
|align=center|
|align=center|
|align=center|
|-
|align=center|1989
|align=center|4th
|align=center|7
|align=center|24 
|align=center|9 
|align=center|5  
|align=center|10   
|align=center|32  
|align=center|32  
|align=center|23
|align=center|
|align=center|
|align=center|
|align=center|
|-
|align=center|1990
|align=center|4th
|align=center|10
|align=center|30  
|align=center|8  
|align=center|7  
|align=center|15  
|align=center|39   
|align=center|53 
|align=center|23
|align=center|
|align=center|
|align=center|
|align=center|
|-
|align=center|1991
|align=center|4th
|align=center|4
|align=center|30    
|align=center|18  
|align=center|3  
|align=center|9  
|align=center|56    
|align=center|30
|align=center|39
|align=center|
|align=center|
|align=center|
|align=center|
|-
|align=center|1992–93
|align=center|4th
|align=center bgcolor=silver|2
|align=center|26  
|align=center|17  
|align=center|4  
|align=center|5  
|align=center|53   
|align=center|23
|align=center|38
|align=center|
|align=center|
|align=center|
|align=center|
|-
|align=center|1993–94
|align=center|4th
|align=center bgcolor=tan|3
|align=center|26  
|align=center|14  
|align=center|6  
|align=center|6  
|align=center|54   
|align=center|26
|align=center|34
|align=center|
|align=center|
|align=center|
|align=center|
|-
|align=center|1994–95
|align=center|4th
|align=center bgcolor=silver|2
|align=center|30
|align=center|20  
|align=center|3  
|align=center|7  
|align=center|69  
|align=center|32
|align=center|63
|align=center|
|align=center|
|align=center|
|align=center|
|-
|align=center|1995–96
|align=center|3rd "B"
|align=center|18
|align=center|38
|align=center|5
|align=center|4
|align=center|29
|align=center|24
|align=center|37
|align=center|19
|align=center|1/64 finals
|align=center|
|align=center|
|align=center bgcolor=red|Relegated
|-
|align=center|1997–2002
|align=center colspan=13| Shakhtar competes in the Luhansk Oblast competition
|-
|align=center rowspan=2|2003
|align=center rowspan=2|4th
|align=center bgcolor=tan|3
|align=center|8
|align=center|2
|align=center|1
|align=center|5
|align=center|6
|align=center|12
|align=center|7
|align=center rowspan=2|
|align=center rowspan=2|
|align=center rowspan=2|
|align=center|
|-
|align=center bgcolor=tan|3
|align=center|6
|align=center|2
|align=center|1
|align=center|3
|align=center|5
|align=center|7
|align=center|7
|align=center|
|-
|align=center|2004–2005
|align=center colspan=13| Shakhtar competes in the Luhansk Oblast competition
|-
|align=center rowspan=3|2006
|align=center rowspan=3|4th
|align=center bgcolor=gold|1
|align=center|4
|align=center|2
|align=center|2
|align=center|0
|align=center|5
|align=center|3
|align=center|8
|align=center rowspan=3|
|align=center rowspan=3|
|align=center rowspan=3 bgcolor=gold|Winner
|align=center|
|-
|align=center bgcolor=gold|1
|align=center|6
|align=center|4
|align=center|1
|align=center|1
|align=center|9
|align=center|3
|align=center|13
|align=center|
|-
|align=center bgcolor=gold|1
|align=center|3
|align=center|2
|align=center|1
|align=center|0
|align=center|4
|align=center|1
|align=center|7
|align=center|
|-
|align=center|2007–08
|align=center|3rd "B"
|align=center|5
|align=center|34
|align=center|20
|align=center|6
|align=center|8
|align=center|46
|align=center|27
|align=center|66
|align=center|1/64 finals
|align=center|
|align=center|
|align=center|
|-
|align=center|2008–09
|align=center|3rd "B"
|align=center|8
|align=center|34
|align=center|12
|align=center|13
|align=center|9
|align=center|31
|align=center|22
|align=center|49
|align=center|1/64 finals
|align=center|
|align=center|
|align=center|
|-
|align=center|2009–10
|align=center|3rd "B"
|align=center|6
|align=center|26
|align=center|13
|align=center|7
|align=center|6
|align=center|26
|align=center|15
|align=center|46
|align=center|1/16 finals
|align=center|
|align=center|
|align=center|
|-
|align=center|2010–11
|align=center|3rd "B"
|align=center|6
|align=center|22
|align=center|10
|align=center|3
|align=center|9
|align=center|25
|align=center|30
|align=center|33
|align=center|1/16 finals
|align=center|
|align=center|
|align=center|
|-
|align=center|2011–12
|align=center|3rd "B"
|align=center bgcolor=tan|3
|align=center|26
|align=center|15
|align=center|6
|align=center|5
|align=center|49
|align=center|23
|align=center|51
|align=center|1/16 finals
|align=center|
|align=center|
|align=center|
|-
|align=center rowspan="2"|2012–13
|align=center|3rd "B"
|align=center|3
|align=center|24 			
|align=center|13 			
|align=center|6 	  	
|align=center|5 	   	 	 	
|align=center|33 		
|align=center|18 	 		 	
|align=center|45
|align=center rowspan=2|1/8 finals
|align=center|
|align=center|
|align=center|
|-
|align=center|3rd "2"
|align=center bgcolor=silver|2
|align=center|10
|align=center|6
|align=center|3		 	
|align=center|1	
|align=center|14		
|align=center|8		 	
|align=center|21
|align=center|
|align=center|
|align=center|Lost play-off
|-
|align=center|2013–14
|align=center|3rd
|align=center|5
|align=center|36
|align=center|19
|align=center|10
|align=center|7
|align=center|48
|align=center|29
|align=center|67
|align=center|1/8 finals
|align=center|
|align=center|
|align=center bgcolor=pink|Suspended
|-
|align=center|Since 2014
|align=center colspan=13| Similar Shakhtar Sverdlovsk competes in football competitions of the Russian-occupied territories.
|}

Notes and references

External links
 Official Web Site

Football clubs in Donetsk Oblast
1939 establishments in Ukraine
2014 disestablishments in Ukraine
Defunct football clubs in Ukraine
Association football clubs established in 1939
Association football clubs disestablished in 2014
Mining association football teams in Ukraine